Fiona Lamdin (born 1975–76) is an English journalist who currently works on BBC Points West.

Career

Lamdin's first role as a journalist was in Ecuador working for a radio station, during which she interviewed former US President Jimmy Carter.  She started at BBC Radio Bristol in 2000.  She later worked for BBC Radio Bristol and has worked on BBC Radio's Woman's Hour.  She now works as a presenter and reporter at BBC Points West.

In 2009, when thirty weeks pregnant with her second child, she presented a TV feature on political parties' campaigning for parents' voted.  She also has a daughter.

In 2015 she won the EDF Energy award for Television News Journalist of the Year.

In 2016 she won Best Reporter at the Royal Television Society West of England awards, as well as being part of the BBC Points West team that won Best News Coverage for its reporting on the Becky Watts murder trial. 

In July 2020, Lamdin became embroiled in controversy as she used the ethnic slur "nigger" in quoted speech in her report of a racist hit-and-run attack on a black National Health Service worker. BBC Radio 1Xtra DJ Sideman later resigned from the BBC due to this.

References

External links 

Living people
English television journalists
English women journalists
English television presenters
English radio presenters
1970s births
British women television journalists
British women radio presenters
BBC newsreaders and journalists